Pratas Island, also known as the Tungsha Islands or the Dongsha Islands, is a coral island situated in the northern part of the South China Sea administered as part of Cijin District, Kaohsiung, Taiwan. It is the location of the Dongsha Airport.

There are three undersea features in the waters associated with Pratas Island: Pratas Atoll, North Vereker Bank and South Vereker Bank. The atoll is circular, and the crescent-shaped Pratas Island occupies its western part.

There are numerous oil wells to the west of the banks. In 2007, the Dongsha Atoll National Park was established on the island. The People's Republic of China claims the island, atoll and banks as part of Guangdong Province.

Pratas Islands 

 Pratas Atoll is also called Pratas Reef.

Tungsha Island (Tung-sha Tao) is the Wade–Giles-derived romanization of the Mandarin Chinese name for the island, and Dongsha Island (Dongsha Dao) is the pinyin-derived name. A smaller island with the same Chinese character name is located in the Taiwan-administered Dongyin Township in the Matsu Islands in the East China Sea.

The area including the island, atoll and banks is also called the Pratas Islands, the Tungsha Islands and the Dongsha Islands. Despite these names, Pratas Island is the only island; there is no group of islands.

History 
The East Indiaman  was wrecked on Pratas Island on or about 22 October 1800 with the loss of all aboard. At the time the island was known to British sailors as "Perates". In 1851, the British screw sloop  wrecked on the south-east bend of Pratas Atoll while going to the aid of another wrecked vessel; the crew were all saved. Decades later, the boilers and parts of the machinery of the wreckage of HMS Reynard remained visible on the atoll.

In 1859–1861, there was a correspondence between the British Colonial Office and the Hong Kong colonial authorities about building a lighthouse on the main island on the atoll. Despite an offer by a British businessman in Xiamen (Amoy) to build it, it was decided that the cost was too great and the matter lapsed. It is clear from the correspondence that no one supposed the atoll to be a part of any known jurisdiction, so negotiations might have been required to ensure that any construction would be legal.

One consequence of that initiative was that, in 1858, the Royal Navy survey ship  completed the first detailed survey of the atoll, resulting in the Plan of the Pratas Reef and Island, J. Richards and others, April 1858, being published by the British Admiralty. On the resulting chart three positions are proposed for a lighthouse: on Pratas Island, on the north-east corner, or on the southern edge near where HMS Reynard had stranded. In the north-east corner of the lagoon the chart notes "Anchorage for junks", indicating regular use by fishing and other small vessels taking shelter. The chart's rubric noted that the available safe draft for vessels entering was only , so it was restricted to relatively small vessels only.

In 1866, Cuthbert Collingwood (naturalist) visited Pratas Island and later published a description of it.

In 1908–1909, a Japanese businessman named Nishizawa Yoshizi (西澤吉次) established a guano collecting station. He destroyed the Dawang Joss House (大王庙), dug up graves and poured the bone ashes of Chinese fishermen into the sea, and renamed the atoll "Nishizawa Island". After a diplomatic confrontation, Chinese sovereignty was re-established, and Nishizawa withdrew, after being compensated by the Guangdong provincial government, and after paying compensation for the destruction of a Chinese fishermen's shrine.

In December 1930, the schooner  (Netherlands) ran aground on a coral reef off Pratas Island and was wrecked.

Casualties are unknown but her commanding officer was killed.

Japanese naval personnel occupied Pratas Island during World War II. The Japanese Navy used the island as a weather station and listening post. On May 29, 1945, at 10:22 AM, a landing party consisting of Australian commandos and US naval personnel from the submarine  raised the US flag, declared the island a United States territory, and named it Bluegill Island. The landing party destroyed a radio tower, weather station, fuel and ammunition dumps, and several buildings.  They encountered no resistance because the Japanese had left the island prior to the arrival of Bluegill.

Pratas Island was later restored to Guangdong Province of the Republic of China (ROC). On September 12, 1946, the navy of the Republic of China took over and garrisoned Pratas Island.

On 6 June 1949, the ROC established the Hainan Special Administrative District (海南特別行政區), which included Pratas Island.

In autumn 1954, the senior ROC politician Chiang Ching-kuo visited the island and made an inspection.

On 9 June 1960, during Typhoon Mary, the Hong Kong cargo ship  was driven against Pratas Reef and wrecked. Her 55 crew took to the liferafts and were rescued by the USS Yorktown (CV-10).

While underway in the South China Sea on 18 July 1965, the USS Frank Knox ran aground on Pratas Reef, and was only freed on 24 August after a very difficult salvage effort.

On 13 April 1996, the jurisdiction of the Taiwan Kaohsiung District Court was extended to include Tungsha Island (Pratas Island).

In May 1999, Kaohsiung Mayor Frank Hsieh visited the island and hung an address plate on the island’s fishing service station. On 21 December 2000, ROC President Chen Shui-bian visited the island with Kaohsiung Mayor Frank Hsieh. On 28 July 2005, President Chen Shui-bian again visited the island and inaugurated the Fifth Maritime Patrol Squad of the Coast Guard Administration.

In January 2007, the ROC government designated the Pratas atoll as the Dongsha Atoll National Park, the first marine national park in Taiwan.

On 8 January 2013, an office of Chunghwa Post was established on Pratas Island.

In September 2020, the PRC conducted air drills over the waters between the main island of Taiwan and Pratas Island that intruded into the ROC air defense identification zone (ADIZ). The planes were issued radio warnings by the ROC military until they left.

On 15 October 2020, a regular civilian charter flight by Uni Air had to abandon its trip from the main island of Taiwan to Pratas Island when Hong Kong air traffic controllers told the captain of the aircraft that there were "dangerous activities" happening below  and that the Uni Air aircraft could not enter the Hong Kong Flight Information Region (FIR). The transcript of the conversation between the pilot and air traffic control was released by the ROC Civil Aeronautics Administration. The next day, the ROC Minister of National Defense Yen Teh-fa called on PRC not to "disrupt the order of international aviation". On 20 October, Deputy Chief of the ROC  General Staff, Lieutenant-General Li Ting-sheng (李廷盛), visited Pratas Island. He made an inspection of the living facilities of the military personnel and gave them instructions. On 26 October, the same Uni Air aircraft made the round trip flight between the main island of Taiwan and Pratas Island.

On 27 October 2020, a Y8 PRC military aircraft entered ROC airspace between the main island of Taiwan and Pratas Island for the twenty-first time that month. On 28 October, Zhu Fenglian of the Taiwan Affairs Office of the PRC was asked whether, in light of PLA military exercises in Fujian and Guangdong, there was or was not a plan to take Pratas Island from the ROC. Feng responded that she did not have to answer hypothetical questions. On 2 November, eight Chinese PLAAF aircraft breached the ROC air defense identification zone (ADIZ) above an area of sea near Pratas Island. On 3 November, Y-8 plane entered the ADIZ of the ROC in the area between the main island of Taiwan and Pratas Island. On 4 November, the ROC Minister of National Defense, Yen Teh-fa, stated in a legislative hearing that since January 2020, 276 PRC military planes had entered the airspace between the main island of Taiwan and Pratas Island, activity that Yen associated with plans by the PRC for a creating its own ADIZ in the South China Sea. On 6 December, a PRC air force Y-8 plane entered the Taiwan ADIZ between the main island of Taiwan and Pratas Island, the fifth day in December that PRC military aircraft entered Taiwan's ADIZ.

Geography 

An international team of researchers conducted a comprehensive population genetic analysis of 11 marine species sampled from the island. They concluded that Dongsha Atoll is an important regional stepping-stone that promotes genetic connectivity among South China Sea reefs, as marine larvae can potentially reach a large number of reefs in the northern South China Sea. The protection of the island and surrounding reefs by the Taiwanese government as Dongsha Atoll National Park may therefore benefit the entire region.

The island is made up of coral atolls and reef flats. Brush, vines and bushes cover some of the island - the rest is white sand. Flora and fauna on and around Pratas Island include:
 Silver silk tree
 Strawberry tung tree
 Coconut tree
 Little terns
 Turnstones
 Gull-billed terns
 Parrotfish
 Starfish
 Rock lobsters

In the Journal of Science (April 1867) there is a nine-page article entitled "The Natural History of Pratas Island in the China Sea" by Dr. Cuthbert Collingwood, the naturalist on board . It describes what was observed, especially bird life, during a visit of two days while the survey ship lay at anchor. Collingwood explored the island on 30 April 1866.

North and South Vereker Banks are under water. Two to three miles of deep water separate North Vereker Bank and South Vereker Bank. The associated production platform and SPM make up Lu Feng Terminal; the terminal is enclosed by a restricted area. Exploration for oil is taking place in this area.

There are also some seamount formations nearby which are not part of the three atolls:
 Jianfeng Seamount (尖峰海山)
 Maojia Seamount (芼架海山)
 Beipo Seamount (北波海山)

Politics and government 
The island is part of the Republic of China (Taiwan) with the postal code 817.  Although there are no long-term inhabitants on the island, Pratas is administered by the Kaohsiung City Government under Cijin District (Qijin). The island has been uninhabited, yet nations (including China and Japan) have claimed them to be their overseas territory.

Military
, about five hundred Taiwanese marines were stationed on Pratas Island. The island has a network of underground bunkers. According to regulations updated on December 2, 2020, in the event that communication is cut off between mainland Taiwan and Pratas Island or Taiping Island (Itu Aba), the highest-ranking local officer can make the decision to fire back at assailants.

Cross-strait relations
The People's Republic of China claims the Pratas Islands as part of Chengqu, Shanwei (Swabue), Guangdong Province.

According to an anonymous PLA source, plans created around 2010 by China for an air defence identification zone in the South China Sea include Pratas Island airspace. The PLA's actions near the southeast corner of the Taiwan ADIZ and Pratas Island in late 2020 led to speculation that the area might be declared part of an ADIZ by China.

In the later half of 2020, repeated reports of Chinese military exercises and fly overs near the island were interpreted as an apparent attempt to cut off the supply line between Pratas Island and mainland Taiwan.

Pratas Island settlement 
As an island with no permanent inhabitants, it is visited largely by fishermen, military personnel and researchers.  Amateur radio operators participating in the DXCC and Islands on the Air awards programs also visit occasionally.

Landmarks
An obelisk was erected after 1946.

In 1954 the ROC Government personnel stationed on Pratas erected a stone tablet on the southern side of the island, facing the ocean.

The Da Wang temple is dedicated to 'Kuang Kang' and 'The South China Sea Goddess' - Mazu. It is said that the statue of Guan Gong came to Pratas Island on a canoe in 1948. The soldiers on Pratas Island built a temple to worship her in 1975. Today, the canoe is still kept in the temple. The joss sticks and candles are donated by soldiers, as was the golden sign hung in front of the statue. There is an 'Ever Green' pavilion in front of the temple which was also built by the soldiers. It is the most verdant place on the island.

The Minister for Internal Affairs of the ROC erected the South China Sea Defense stone tablet to declare Republic of China sovereignty in 1989.

In July 1991 the Kaohsiung City Government erected the Pratas Island measuring memorial stone tablet as a symbol that Pratas Island falls within the jurisdiction of Kaohsiung City. Within Kaohsiung, the island belongs to Cijin District (Qijin).

The ROC Government established the Triangulation Benchmark as the triangulation point for Pratas Island in December 1991. There are words on each side of the base of the triangulation point stone tablet. They read 'The Pratas Triangulation Point' on the front, and 'Longitude: 116o 43" 42.5601'E, Latitude: 20o 42' 6.2415'N, Height: 2.4875 meters.' The words 'Defend the South China Sea', written by the commander, Lo Ben Li, were also engraved on the stone tablet. The National Tsing Hua University webpage about the island states: "In addition to making it more convenient to survey and draw navigational maps, and to construct and develop facilities on the island, the establishment of the triangulation point is also the basis of our sovereign rights."

Public buildings

The library is located on one side of the main plaza, and is the center for soldiers to obtain spiritual nourishment. The library contains more than two thousand books.

The military post office is Office No. 67. The Ministry of Transportation and Communications issued the 'South China Sea Islands Map Stamps' in 1996, as a set of two stamps. The inscription 'South China Sea Defense' from the national stone tablet on Pratas Island was printed on the five-dollar stamp, and the 'Defend the South China Sea' inscription from the national stone tablet on Taiping Island was printed on the seventeen-dollar stamp. The background was the south China coastline, Taiwan and Hainan Island with the blue sky and sea. This was the first time that the ROC had issued stamps with the theme of the South China Sea.

In 1987 the military and civilian occupants built the 'Pratas Fishermen's Service Station'. The station was built in traditional Chinese courtyard house style, and provides convenient services for fishermen and boats in the South China Sea, insuring the fishermen's safety and upholding ROC sovereignty. The services provided include lodging, medical rescue, entertainment and supply. The station also provides lodging for the scientists who come to conduct research on the island.

In 2012 National Sun Yat-sen University's Dongsha Atoll Research Station (DARS) was established for biology, biogeochemistry, and oceanography research.

Energy
Diesel-fueled generators are used to power the island. In March 2016, a solar energy system built by the Coast Guard Administration went into operation. The system covers an area of 310.6 m2 and produces 53,200 kWh of electricity each year.

Transportation
The Dongsha Island Airport features a runway located on the north end of Pratas Island with a small airport terminal at the eastern end. The airport is used by the ROC military. A main shack and subordinate shack are located on the southeast end of the island. There are no refueling facilities.

Two piers on the southeast shore allow for small watercraft to land.

A circle with a radius of  centered on Pratas Island, referred to as VHR7, is a prohibited area for aeronautical purposes. The 'VH' in VHR7 denotes 'Hong Kong' and the 'R' denotes a 'Restricted Area'. Pratas Island and VHR7 are located within the Hong Kong Flight Information Region (FIR).

Gallery

See also 
 List of islands of Taiwan
 List of Taiwanese superlatives
 Politics of the Republic of China
 South China Sea Islands

References

External links 

 Satellite image of the Pratas atoll, Google Maps
 History, www.laserbase.com.tw
 Pratas Island, vm.nthu.edu.tw
 Ecological Resources, vm.nthu.edu.tw
 Man-made sights, vm.nthu.edu.tw
 東沙二十part1：擁有世界級珊瑚生態的神秘東沙島在哪裡？ 

Archipelagoes of the Pacific Ocean
Islands of Taiwan
Landforms of Kaohsiung
Islands of the South China Sea
Disputed islands
Territorial disputes of China
Territorial disputes of the Republic of China